KNAK-LP (97.1 FM, "KNAK-LP 97.1") is a radio station licensed to serve the community of Naknek, Alaska. The station is owned by King's Chapel Bristol Bay Radio and airs a Christian radio format.

The station was assigned the KNAK-LP call letters by the Federal Communications Commission on July 1, 2015.

References

External links
 Official Website
 FCC Public Inspection File for KNAK-LP
 

NAK-LP
Radio stations established in 2017
2017 establishments in the United States
NAK-LP
Bristol Bay Borough, Alaska